Falta may refer to:

 Falta, South 24 Parganas, a town in the Indian state of West Bengal
 Falta (community development block), an administrative division in South 24 Parganas district, West Bengal
 Falta (Vidhan Sabha constituency), a legislative assembly constituency in South 24 Parganas district, West Bengal
 Falta Amor, an album by Mexican rock band Maná released in 1990
 Jaroslav Falta (born 1951), Czech motocross racer
 Ladislav Falta (born 1936), Czech sport shooter and Olympic medalist
 Šimon Falta, Czech footballer
 4663 Falta, a minor planet in the asteroid belt